Revelstoke is a former civil parish, now in the parish of Newton and Noss, in the South Hams district, in the county of Devon, England. It has a church called Church of St Peter the Poor Fisherman. The parish contained the village of Noss Mayo. It was is in the Plympton St Mary district, and is located almost 2 miles south east of Newton Ferrers. In 1931 the civil parish had a population of 347. On the 1 April 1935 the parish was merged to create Newton and Noss.

History 
The name "Revelstoke" means 'Outlying farm/settlement' with the incorporation of the Revel family name'.

References 

Former civil parishes in Devon
South Hams